Cecilia Lundqvist (born 1971 in Eskilstuna) is a Swedish artist, working exclusively with animation. She is best known for the short films "Trim" (1997), "Souvenir" (1999) and "Emblem" (2001). In 2004 she received Filmform's Honorary Award .

Lundqvist's films can be found in the collections of Centre Georges Pompidou in Paris and Moderna Museet in Stockholm.

Notable works

 Power Play  (2004)
 Smile  (2003)
 C  (2001)
 Emblem  (2001)
 Beware of Playing Children  (2000)
 Absolutely Normal  (2000)
 Souvenir  (1999)
 Rebus  (1999)
 Trim  (1999)

References

1971 births
Living people
20th-century Swedish women artists
20th-century Swedish artists
21st-century Swedish women artists
21st-century Swedish artists
Swedish contemporary artists
Swedish video artists